Puripol Boonson (born 13 January 2006 in Surin) is a Thai sprinter who specializes in the 100 and 200 metres. His 200 metres time is the Southeast Asian Games record.

With a national record of 20.19 s (+1.7m/s) run in Almaty (KAZ) on 26 June 2022, he realised the AU20R and AU18R.

On 3 June 2022, he established in Yecheon the National record of 4x100 m in 38.56 s with Chayut Khongprasit, Siripol Punpa and Soraoat Dapbang.

On 2 August 2022, he broke the under-18 World Best Performances of the 100 m with 10.09 s (+0.7 m/s) at the semi-finals of the 2022 World Athletics U20 championships in Cali. He finishes fourth of the final with 10.12 s (+0.8 m/s)

References 

2006 births
Living people
Puripol Boonson
Southeast Asian Games medalists in athletics
Puripol Boonson
Competitors at the 2021 Southeast Asian Games
Puripol Boonson
Puripol Boonson